Mount Griffiths is an elongated mountain with two prominent peaks of , standing  northwest of the Wilkinson Peaks and  northwest of Mount Elkins in the Napier Mountains of Enderby Land, Antarctica.

Discovery and naming
The mountain was plotted by Norwegian cartographers from aerial photos taken by the Lars Christensen Expedition of 1936–37, and was called "Mefjell" (middle mountain), a name used elsewhere in Antarctica. It was visited in 1961 by an Australian National Antarctic Research Expeditions sledge party and was named by the Antarctic Names Committee of Australia for G.S. Griffiths, a member of the Australian Antarctic Exploration Committee of 1886.

References

Mountains of Enderby Land